Secret Escapes is a members-only British travel company selling heavily discounted luxury hotel stays and trips through its website and mobile app. 
Secret Escapes operates in Belgium, Czech Republic, Denmark, France, Germany, Italy, Netherlands, Norway, Spain, Sweden, Switzerland, United Kingdom and the United States.

History 
Secret Escapes was formerly called DMC Cruise Limited until 16 Nov 2010 when it was re-branded as Secret Escapes by Tom Valentine and Alex Saint, after identifying a demand in luxury travel deals in the UK.
In 2014, the company acquired the German mobile hotel booking application Justbook to compete with other last minute hotel mobile apps.

In July 2015 the company secured an additional $60m in funding from existing investor Octopus Investments as well as Google Ventures to fund further expansion and acquired UK based mycityvenue in an all-cash-and-stock deal, adding another 1200 venues and 1.4 million members to its portfolio.
According to IBT, the company has over 19 million members and has sold 2 million room nights.

In October 2015, Secret Escapes continued its expansion in Germany by acquiring flash deal site Travista.

In 2017, Secret Escapes acquired Slevomat Group, Central and Eastern Europe's leading travel deals and experience company.

See also
 Lastminute.com
 Expedia
 Travelocity
 Google Ventures
 Mycityvenue

References

External links
 Official website

British travel websites
British companies established in 2010
Transport companies established in 2010
Internet properties established in 2010
Hotel and leisure companies of the United Kingdom
Internet technology companies of the United Kingdom
Companies based in the London Borough of Camden